George Mathew Scott (September 14, 1922 – May 25, 2006) was an American lawyer and jurist who served on the Minnesota Supreme Court.

Early life and education 
The youngest of eight children, Scott was born in Clark, New Jersey, and grew up in a rural home without electricity or running water. Scott joined the United States Army in 1942 and studied engineering at the University of Minnesota through an Army-funded program. The program was eventually ended and Scott participated in the Normandy landings. He studied law at New York University before earning his law degree from the St. Paul College of Law.

Career 
After graduating from law school, Scott practiced law in Minneapolis. Scott was a Minnesota deputy attorney general and attorney for Hennepin County, Minnesota. In 1970, Scott sought the Democrat nomination in the 1970 Minnesota gubernatorial election, losing to Wendell R. Anderson. In 1973, Scott was appointed to the Minnesota Supreme Court and served until 1987.

Personal life 
Scott retired in Miami because of ill health. Scott and his wife, Joyce, had five children, three of whom became attorneys.

References

1922 births
2006 deaths
Politicians from Minneapolis
University of Minnesota alumni
William Mitchell College of Law alumni
Minnesota Democrats
Justices of the Minnesota Supreme Court
20th-century American judges
Lawyers from Minneapolis
20th-century American lawyers

People from Clark, New Jersey